Bertil Carlsson or Bertil Karlsson may refer to
Bertil Carlsson (skier) (1903–1953), Swedish Olympic ski jumper
Bertil Carlsson (weightlifter) (1901–1975), Swedish Olympic weightlifter
Bertil R. Carlsson (1901–1959), Swedish Olympic weightlifter
Bertil Karlsson (1919–2012), Swedish Olympic runner